Raymond Gilloz (27 September 1931 – 18 March 2015) was a French speed skater. He competed at the 1956 Winter Olympics and the 1960 Winter Olympics.

References

External links
 

1931 births
2015 deaths
French male speed skaters
Olympic speed skaters of France
Speed skaters at the 1956 Winter Olympics
Speed skaters at the 1960 Winter Olympics
People from Chamonix
Sportspeople from Haute-Savoie